Russell Percival Blinco (March 12, 1906 – June 28, 1982) was a Canadian professional ice hockey centre who played six seasons in the National Hockey League for the Montreal Maroons and Chicago Black Hawks. Blinco's name was inscribed on the Stanley Cup with the Montreal Maroons in 1935.

Playing career
Blinco began his hockey career with the local Grand-Mere Maroons in 1928–29. In 1929–30, he joined the Brooklyn Crescents of the USAHA. Blinco remained with the Crescents before joining the Windsor Bulldogs of the International Hockey League in 1932–33. Blinco also spent some time in 1932–33 with the Springfield Indians in the Canadian-American Hockey League. In 1933–34, Blinco recorded 11 points in 16 games with the Bulldogs before he was signed on by the Montreal Maroons. In his first season with the Maroons, Blinco recorded 23 points in 34 games, good enough to become the league's second recipient of the Calder Memorial Trophy. In 1934–35, Blinco helped the Maroons reach the Stanley Cup Finals, where they swept the Toronto Maple Leafs in 3 games and won the Stanley Cup. In 1937, he took part in the Howie Morenz Memorial Game where the NHL All-Stars faced off against the Montreal All-Stars. Blinco would remain with the Maroons until 1938–39. He was traded to the Chicago Black Hawks along with teammates Baldy Northcott and Earl Robinson for $30,000 cash. Blinco would play in 48 games with the Black Hawks before retiring. Blinco was the first NHL player to wear spectacles while playing.

He died in 1982.

Awards and achievements
 Calder Memorial Trophy winner in 1934.
 Stanley Cup champion in 1935.
 Played in Howie Morenz Memorial Game.

Career statistics

Regular season and playoffs

Transactions
 December 18, 1932 - Traded to the Montreal Maroons (Windsor Bulldogs-IHL) by the New York Rangers after Springfield Indians (Can-Am) franchise folded.
 September 15, 1932 - Traded to the Chicago Black Hawks by the Montreal Maroons with Baldy Northcott and Earl Robinson for $30,000 cash.

References

External links

1906 births
1982 deaths
Calder Trophy winners
Canadian ice hockey centres
Chicago Blackhawks players
Ice hockey people from Quebec
Montreal Maroons players
Sportspeople from Shawinigan
Stanley Cup champions